Geranium antisanae is a species of plant in the family Geraniaceae. It is endemic to Ecuador.  Its natural habitat is subtropical or tropical high-altitude grassland.

References

antisanae
Endemic flora of Ecuador
Critically endangered plants
Taxonomy articles created by Polbot